Aspergillus arenarioides is a species of fungus in the genus Aspergillus. It is from the Petersonii section. The species was first described in 2014.

Growth and morphology

A. arenarioides has been cultivated on both Czapek yeast extract agar (CYA) plates and Malt Extract Agar Oxoid® (MEAOX) plates. The growth morphology of the colonies can be seen in the pictures below.

References 

arenarioides
Fungi described in 2014